Nationality words link to articles with information on the nation's poetry or literature (for instance, Irish or France).

Events
 May 24 – Lope de Vega becomes a priest.

Works published

Great Britain
 Anonymous, The Life and Death of Hector, often attributed erroneously to Thomas Heywood; a free paraphrase in modernized verse of John Lydgate's (also anonymously published) Troy Book 1513
 Sir William Alexander, Doomes-day; or, The Great Day of the Lords Judgement
 Richard Brathwaite, published anonymously, The Poets Willow; or, The Passionate Shepheard
William Browne, The Shepheard's Pipe
 George Chapman:
 Andromeda Liberata; or, The Nuptials of Perseus and Andromeda, on the marriage of Robert Carr, earl of Somerset, and Frances Howard, formerly countess of Essex
 Homers Odysses, publication year uncertain, Books 1–12 (see also Seaven Bookes of the Iliades of Homer 1598, Homer Prince of Poets 1609, The Iliads of Homer 1611, Twenty-four Bookes of Homers Odisses 1615, The Whole Workes of Homer 1616)
 Sir Arthur Gorges, Poems by William Drummond. Of Hawthornden, publication year uncertain
 Richard Niccols, The Furies. With Vertues Encomium; or, The Image of Honour
 John Norden, The Labyrinth of Mans Life; or Vertues Delieght and Envies Opposite
 Sir Thomas Overbury, A Wife, Now a Widdowe, expanded edition containing the author's Characters, published posthumously
 Joshua Sylvester, translated from the French of Jean Bertaut, The Parliament of Vertues Royal, also includes translations of verse by Guillaume de Salluste Du Bartas (see also Second Session 1615)
 George Wither, A Satyre

Other
 Miguel de Cervantes, Viaje del Parnaso, also known as Viaje al Parnaso (Journey to Parnassus"), dedicated to Rodrigo de Tapia and printed by the widow of Alonso Martín, Spain
 Lope de Vega, Rimas sacras, Spain

Births
Death years link to the corresponding "[year] in poetry" article:
 October 12 – Henry More (died 1687), English philosopher and poet
Also:
 Nicolaes Borremans (died 1674), Dutch Remonstrants preacher, poet, and editor
 John Denham born this year or 1615 (died 1669), English poet and courtier
 Hallgrímur Pétursson (died 1674), one of Iceland's most famous poets and a clergyman

Deaths
Birth years link to the corresponding "[year] in poetry" article:
 October 9 – Bonaventura Vulcanius (born 1538), Dutch humanist scholar and poet
 July 15 – Pierre de Bourdeille, also known as Brantôme (born c. 1540), French soldier, historian, biographer and poet
 Also:
 Francisco de Andrada (born 1540), Portuguese historian and poet
 Rhys Cain (born 1540), Welsh-language poet
 Vitsentzos Kornaros, died this year or 1613 (born 1553), Cretan poet of the Greek Renaissance who wrote the romantic epic poem Erotokritos
 Luisa Carvajal y Mendoza (born 1566), Spanish aristocrat, religious poet and author
 Konoe Nobutada (born 1565), Japanese courtier and man of letters known as a poet, calligrapher, painter and diarist
 Bartosz Paprocki (born 1543), Polish and Czech writer, historiographer, translator, and poet
 Cristóbal de Virués (born 1550), Spanish playwright and poet

See also

 Poetry
 16th century in poetry
 16th century in literature

Notes

17th-century poetry
Poetry